Lucas and Aird was a major civil engineering business operating in the 19th century.

History
The business was formed as a joint venture between Lucas Brothers and John Aird & Co. in 1870. The joint venture was dissolved in 1896.

Major projects
Major projects carried out by the firm included:
The Welland Viaduct completed in 1870
The Royal Albert Dock completed in 1880
The Hull and Barnsley Railway completed in 1885
The Suakin-Berber Railway completed in 1885
The Tilbury Docks completed in 1886
The Blackfriars Railway Bridge completed in 1886 
The West Highland Railway completed in 1895
The Budleigh Salterton Railway completed in 1896
The Plymouth to Yealmpton Branch completed in 1896

References

Lucas and Aird
Lucas and Aird
Construction and civil engineering companies established in 1870
British companies established in 1870
1870 establishments in England